"Use Your Heart" is a song by American R&B trio SWV, released on July 23, 1996 as the second single from their album, New Beginning (1996). Written and produced by The Neptunes, the song contains a sample of "If It Don't Turn You On (You Oughta Leave It Alone)", performed by B.T. Express, and became the first song produced by the duo to chart.

Critical reception
Larry Flick from Billboard described the song as an "sumtuous old-school soul swinger that will have listeners lost in memories of their favorite '70s moments." He added, "These sisters now have the chops to support their bid to become R&B's leading female vocal group. They kick it lovely while Pharrell Williams and Chad Hugo surround their plush harmonies with fluttering horns and even-handed funk guitar licks. Yummy stuff that belongs at the top of every urban playlist."

Track listing
 Maxi-single
 "Use Your Heart" (LP Version)
 "Use Your Heart" (Edit)
 "Use Your Heart" (CDS Version)
 "Use Your Heart" feat. Grampa & Boneyman (Rappers Delight Remix)
 "Use Your Heart" (Acapella)
 "Use Your Heart" (Instrumental)

Charts

Release history

References

1996 singles
SWV songs
Songs written by Chad Hugo
Songs written by Pharrell Williams
1996 songs
RCA Records singles
Song recordings produced by the Neptunes
Contemporary R&B ballads
1990s ballads